Transport in New Zealand, with its mountainous topography and a relatively small population mostly located near its long coastline, has always faced many challenges. Before Europeans arrived, Māori either walked or used watercraft on rivers or along the coasts. Later on, European shipping and railways revolutionised the way of transporting goods and people, before being themselves overtaken by road and air, which are nowadays the dominant forms of transport. However, bulk freight still continues to be transported by coastal shipping and by rail transport, and there are attempts to (re)introduce public transport as a major transport mode in the larger population centres.

Historically very car-dependent, transport funding in New Zealand is still heavily dominated by money for road projects–in 2010 the government proposed to spend $21 billion on roading infrastructure after 2012, yet only $0.7 billion on other transport projects (public transport, walking and cycling). This was criticised by opponents as irresponsible, in light of increasing fuel prices and congestion. Public transport is primarily a local government responsibility whereas state highways are the responsibility of central government.

Road transport

The state highway network is the principal road infrastructure connecting New Zealand urban centres. It is administered by the NZ Transport Agency. The majority of smaller or urban roads are managed by city or district councils, although some fall under the control of other authorities, such as the New Zealand Department of Conservation or port and airport authorities.

New Zealand has left-hand traffic on its roads.

History
Before Europeans arrived, Māori either walked or used watercraft on rivers or along the coasts. The road network of New Zealand has its origins in these tracks and paths used by Māori and later by Europeans in their early travels through New Zealand. Several major Māori tracks were known, such as the western coastal track was used along the whole length of the North Island, and the track on the East Coast, which left the coast near Castlepoint and rejoined it near Napier. In the South Island, another major track existed down the east coast with tributary tracks following streams up to the mountain passes to the West Coast. Mountains, swamp, and dense bush made inland routes tricky to traverse, and early settlers also made use of beaches as roads, for walking, riding horses, and herding sheep. Many farms had access via beaches only, and beaches were used as runways for planes. Some beaches are still used by planes, for example at Ōkārito and on the west coast of Stewart Island / Rakiura.

Initial roads, such as the Great South Road southwards from Auckland, were often built by the British Army to move troops, and were constructed to a comparatively high standard. Early sheep farming required few high-standard roads, but the strong increase in dairy farming in the late 19th century created a strong demand for better links on which the more perishable goods could be transported to market or towards ports for export. In many cases, later roads for motor vehicles follow paths used by bullock carts which followed tracks made for humans. These in turn in some cases became highways – with attendant problems all over New Zealand (but especially in the more mountainous regions), as the geography and contours of a slow-speed road laid out in the first half of the 20th century usually do not conform to safety and comfort criteria of modern motor vehicles.

Early road construction was both hindered and helped by rail transport during the first half century of European settlement. Authorities were reluctant to expend large amounts of capital on more difficult sections of a route where there was a hope that a railway might instead be built. However, where railways were constructed, roads often either preceded them for construction or quickly followed it when the newly accessible land started to be settled more closely.

The New Zealand highway system was extended massively after World War II. The first motorway was built in the environs of Wellington and opened in 1950, between Takapu Road and Johnsonville. Following heavy investment in road construction from the 1950s onwards, public transport patronage fell nationwide. This has been described, in Auckland's case, as "one of the most spectacular declines in public transport patronage of any developed city in the world".

Network
The state highways carry 50% of all New Zealand road traffic, with the motorways alone carrying 9% of all traffic (even though they represent only 3% of the whole state highway network, and even less of the whole road network).

Speed limits

Speeds are often reduced to  beside roadworks.

Private landowners may set their own speed limits, for example , although these are not enforced by police of road authorities.

The Land Transport Rule: Setting of Speed Limits (2017) allows road controlling authorities to set enforceable speed limits, including permanent speed limits, of less than 50 km/h on roads within their jurisdiction.

Road safety
Total road deaths in New Zealand are high by developed country standards. 2010 figures from the International Transport Forum placed New Zealand 25th out of 33 surveyed countries in terms of road deaths per capita, a rank that has changed little in 30 years. The fatality rate per capita is twice the level of Germany's, or that of the United Kingdom, Sweden or the Netherlands (2010 comparison). This is variously blamed on aggressive driving, insufficient driver training, old and unsafe cars, inferior road design and construction, and a lack of appreciation of the skill and responsibility required to safely operate a motor vehicle.

In 2010, 375 'road users' were killed in New Zealand, while 14,031 were injured, with 15- to 24-year-olds the group at highest risk. The three most common vehicle movements resulting in death or injury were "head-on collisions (while not overtaking)", "loss of control (on straight)" and "loss of control (while cornering)". In terms of deaths per 10,000 population, the most dangerous areas were the Waitomo District (121 deaths) and the Mackenzie District (110). Larger cities were comparatively safe, with Auckland City (28), Wellington (22) and Christchurch (28), while Dunedin had a higher rate of 43.

New Zealand has a large number of overseas drivers (tourists, business, students and new immigrants), as well as renting campervans/motorhomes/RV's during the New Zealand summer. Overseas licensed drivers are significantly more likely to be found at fault in a collision in which they are involved (66.9%), compared to fully licensed New Zealand drivers (51.9%), and only slightly less likely to be found at fault than restricted (novice) New Zealand drivers (68.9%).

Drunk driving is a major issue in New Zealand, especially among young drivers. New Zealand has relatively low penalties for drunk driving. In the late 2000s, reports indicated that the rate of drunk driving by under 20s in Auckland had risen 77% in three years, with similar increases in the rest of the country. Many drunk drivers already had convictions for previous drunk driving.

The road toll has decreased over the 5 years from 421 in 2007 to 284 in 2011

In the 'Safer Journeys' Strategy, intended to guide road safety developments between 2010 and 2020, the Ministry of Transport aims for a 'safe systems' approach, prioritised four areas, being "Increasing the safety of young drivers", "Reducing alcohol/drug impaired driving", "Safe roads and roadsides" and "Increasing the safety of motorcycling".

Funding
Historically, most roads in New Zealand were funded by local road authorities (often road boards) who derived their income from local rates. As the need for new roads was often most urgent in those parts of the country where little rate income could yet be collected, the funding was at least partly dependent on national-level subsidies, for which much lobbying was undertaken. Many acts and ordinances were passed in the first decades of the colony, but lack of funds and parochialism (the desire to spend locally raised money locally, rather than use it to link different provinces) hindered the growth of the road network. This lack of larger-scale planning eventually led to increased public works powers given to the Central Government.

Today, all funding for state highways and around 50% of funding for local roads comes directly from road users through the National Land Transport Fund. Road user revenue directed to the fund includes all fuel excise duty on LPG and CNG, around 55% of revenue from fuel excise duty on petrol, all revenue from road user charges (a prepaid distance/weight licence that all vehicles over 3.5 tonnes, and all non-petrol/LPG/CNG vehicles are liable to pay) and most non-ACC revenue from motor vehicle registration and licensing fees. In addition, in the last three years the government has increasingly allocated additional funds to land transport, to the extent that today the total expenditure by the NZ Transport Agency on land transport projects exceeds road tax revenue collected. The remainder of funding for local city and district roads primarily comes from local authority property rates.

As of 2010, transport funding in New Zealand is still heavily biased towards road projects – the National government proposes to spend $21 billion on roading infrastructure after 2012, yet only $0.7 billion on other transport projects (public transport, walking and cycling). This has been criticised by opponents of the current government strategy as irresponsible, in light of increasing fuel prices and congestion. Government has claimed that their priority on roads is in line with New Zealanders' favoured travel modes, and as being the most promising in terms of economic benefits.

Vehicle fleet

One of the earliest counts/estimates of motor vehicles in New Zealand had them at 82,000 in 1925. This soon increased to 170,000 on the eve of World War II in 1939, continuing to 425,000 in 1953 and increasing to 1,000,000 in 1971. In the first national vehicle registration of 1925, 99,233 plates were issued. In 1931 156,180 motor-vehicles were registered and those licensed were 298,586 in 1939 and 380,503 in 1950.

Just over half of the light passenger vehicles first registered in New Zealand are used imports. In 2013 new car registrations were up 7% on 2012 to 82,235 sold, with used vehicle sales up to 98,971.

At the 2013 New Zealand census, 92.1 percent of households reported owning at least one car; 37.6 percent reported owning one car, 38.4 percent reported as owning two cars, and 16.1 percent reported owing three or more cars. Car ownership was highest in the Tasman Region (95.9 percent) and lowest in the Wellington Region (88.3 percent).

In 2015, 3.018 million were light passenger vehicles, 507,000 were light commercial vehicles, 137,000 were heavy trucks, 10,000 were buses and 160,000 were motorcycles and mopeds. The mean age of a New Zealand car (as of end of 2015) was 14.2 years, with trucks at 17.6 years. 38% of light vehicles in 2017 were 15 years +, 171,000 being deregistered, but 334,000 added.

By 2017 there were 792 light vehicles per 1,000 people, one of the highest vehicle ownerships in the world and they covered 9,265 km/capita.

Average engine capacity of light vehicles grew to 2010 and was about 2,290cc in 2017, with average CO2 emissions about 180 g/km.

Freight 
Freight tonne-km in 2017, were up 7.3% to 25.3 billion tkm from 23.6 billion tkm in 2016.

The modal share of freight operations in 2017/18 was -

Passenger services

Without rapid transit, transport by bus services form the main component of public transport services in New Zealand cities, and the country also has a network of long-distance bus or coach services, augmented by door-to-door inter-city shuttle vans, a type of shared taxi.

The first widespread motor vehicle services were shared taxi services termed service cars; a significant early provider was Aard, operating elongated Hudson Super Sixes. By 1920 AARD covered most of the North Island and even provided transport for the Prince of Wales. By 1924 the services covered even more areas. Aard was taken over by New Zealand Railways Road Services in 1928. The road fleet of New Zealand Railways Corporation was privatised in 1991 with the long-distance business still existing as InterCity, having more recently incorporated Newmans Coachlines. Another former extensive coach business was Mount Cook Landlines, which closed in the 1990s. Internet-based nakedbus.com is building another nationwide network, partly as a reseller of several smaller bus operators' capacity.

Intercity and Tourism Holdings Ltd are significant sightseeing / tourism coach operators.

Cycling

While relatively popular for sport and recreation, bicycle use is a very marginal commuting mode, with the percentage share hovering around 1% in many major cities, and around 2% nationwide (2000s figures). This is primarily due to safety fears. For instance Auckland Regional Transport Authority reports that "over half of Aucklanders believe it is usually unsafe, or always unsafe, to cycle".

The high risk to bicycle users is due to a number of factors. Motorists tend to exhibit hostile attitudes towards bicycle riders. Bicycles are classed as 'vehicles', a transport class legally obliged to use the road, forcing bicycle users to mingle with heavy and fast-moving motor vehicles; only postal workers are legally permitted to ride on footpaths. Bicycle infrastructure and the standards underpinning bicycle infrastructure planning are poor and bicycles receive relatively very low levels of funding by both central and local government. It has also been argued that the introduction of New Zealand's compulsory bicycle helmet law contributed to the decline in the popularity of cycling.

Rail transport

Network
Of this, 506 km is electrified. The national network's land is owned by New Zealand Railways Corporation, and the network owner and major rail transport operator is the state-owned enterprise KiwiRail. The national network consists of three main trunk lines, seven secondary main lines and during its peak in the 1950s, around ninety branch lines. The majority of the latter are now closed. Most lines were constructed by government but a few were of private origin, later nationalised. In 1931, the Transport Licensing Act was passed, protecting the railways from competition for fifty years. The Railways Corporation was created in 1983 from the New Zealand Railways Department, and the land transport industry became fully deregulated in 1983.

Between 1982 and 1993 the rail industry underwent a major overhaul involving corporatisation, restructuring, downsizing, line and station closures and privatisation. In 1991 the Railways Corporation was split up, with New Zealand Rail Limited established to operate the rail and inter-island ferry services and own the rail network, with the parcels and bus services sold to private investors. The Railways Corporation continued to own the land underneath the rail network, as well as significant property holdings that were disposed of. In 1993 New Zealand Rail was itself privatised and was listed by its new owners in 1995, and renamed Tranz Rail. The Government agreed to take over control of the national rail network back when Toll Holdings purchased Tranz Rail in 2003, under the auspices of ONTRACK, a division of the Railways Corporation. In May 2008 the Government agreed to buy Toll NZ's rail and ferry operations for $665 million, and renamed the operating company KiwiRail.
New Zealand has no rapid transit metro lines.

Operators and services
Bulk freights dominate services, particularly coal, logs and wood products, milk and milk products, fertiliser, containers, steel and cars. Long distance passenger services are limited to three routes – the TranzAlpine (Christchurch – Greymouth), the TranzCoastal (Christchurch – Picton) and the Northern Explorer (Wellington – Auckland). Urban rail services operate in Wellington and Auckland, and interurban services run between Palmerston North and Wellington (the Capital Connection) ; Masterton and Wellington (the Wairarapa Connection) and from April 2021 between Hamilton and  Auckland (Te Huia).

For most of its history, New Zealand's rail services were operated by the Railways Department. In 1982, the Department was corporatised as the New Zealand Railways Corporation. The Corporation was split in 1990 between a limited liability operating company, New Zealand Rail Limited, and the Corporation which retained a number of assets to be disposed. New Zealand Rail was privatised in 1993, and renamed Tranz Rail in 1995. In 2001, Tranz Rail's long-distance passenger operations, under the guise of Tranz Scenic, became a separate company; Tranz Rail chose not to bid for the contract to run Auckland's rail services, and the contract was won by Connex (now Transdev Auckland). Proposals to sell Tranz Rail's Wellington passenger rail services, Tranz Metro, did not come to fruition, although the division became a separate company in July 2003. In 2003 Tranz Rail was purchased by Australian freight firm Toll Holdings, which renamed the company Toll NZ.

The only other significant non-heritage operator is the tourist oriented Dunedin Railways in Otago, which runs regular passenger trains on part of the former Otago Central Railway and some on the Main South Line. On 20 April 2020 the company announced that due to the COVID-19 pandemic, it mothballed its track and equipment.

Heritage

The Federation of Rail Organisations of New Zealand coordinates the work of approximately sixty heritage railways and rail museums. Most of these are operated by groups of volunteers and have a historical or tourist focus.

Water transport

New Zealand has a long history of international and coastal shipping. Both Maori and the New Zealand European settlers arrived from overseas, and during the early European settler years, coastal shipping was one of the main methods of transportation, while it was hard to move goods to or from the hinterlands, thus limiting the locations of early settlement.

The two main islands are separated by Cook Strait, 24 km wide at its narrowest point, but requiring a 70-km ferry trip to cross. This is the only large-scale long-distance car / passenger shipping service left, with all others restricted to short ferry routes to islands like Stewart Island / Rakiura or Great Barrier Island.

New Zealand has 1,609 km of navigable inland waterways; however these are no longer significant transport routes.

International shipping
Historically, international shipping to and from New Zealand started out with the first explorer-traders, with New Zealand waters soon becoming a favourite goal for whalers as well as merchants trading with the Maori and beginning European colonies.

In the 19th century, one of the most important changes for New Zealand shipping – and for New Zealand itself – came with the introduction of refrigerated ships, which allowed New Zealand to export meat to overseas, primarily to the United Kingdom. This led to a booming agricultural industry which was suddenly offered a way to ship their goods to markets around the world.

Larger, deeper-draught ships from the middle of the 19th century made dredges a common sight in shipping channels around New Zealand, and tugboats were also often bought to assist them to the quays, where electric or hydraulic cranes were increasingly used for on- and off-loading. However, manpower was still needed in large amounts, and waterfronts were the hotbeds of the industrial actions of the early 20th century.

In the 1970s, containerisation revolutionised shipping, eventually coming to New Zealand as well. The local harbour boards wrought massive changes on those ports selected (after much political wrangling) to handle the new giant vessels, such as Lyttelton and Auckland Port. Gantry cranes, straddle carriers and powerful tugboats were built or purchased, and shipping channels dredged deeper, while large areas of land were reclaimed to enable the new container terminals. The changes have been described as having been more radical than the changeover from sail to steam a century before.

However, containerisation made many of the smaller ports suffer, this being only later recovered somewhat with newer, smaller multi-purpose ships that could travel to smaller ports, and the loosening of the trade links with the United Kingdom, which diversified the trade routes. The time for river ports had gone however, and most of them disappeared, facing particular pressure from the new rail ferries, In the 1980s, deregulation also involved and heavily changed the port industry, with harbour boards abolished, and replaced by more commercially focused companies. Many port jobs were lost, though shipping costs fell.

Coastal shipping
As noted above, coastal shipping has long played a significant role in New Zealand. It was very efficient for moving large amounts of goods, and relatively quick. In 1910, it was noted in a discussion with the Minister of Railways that a fruit grower at Port Albert (near Wellsford, less than 150 km from Auckland) had found it cheaper to ship his canned fruit to Lyttleton in the South Island by boat, and thence back to Auckland again, rather than pay rail freight rates from nearby Wellsford to Auckland.

The industry however also faced a number of troubled times as well, such as during World War II when ship requisitioning caused shortages in the transport operation. While many ports reopened after the war, they (and coastal shipping in general) faced huge pressure from rail (presumably now offering improved freight rates compared to the 1910 era).

After cabotage was abolished in 1994, international shipping lines became able to undertake coastal shipping as opportune to them on their international routes to New Zealand. While reducing the cargo reshipment rates for New Zealand industry, this is seen by some as a heavy blow for local competitors, who, specialised in coastal shipping only, are less able to achieve the costs savings of large lines – these can generally operate profitably even without cargo on New Zealand-internal legs of their routes, and are thus able to underbid others. The law change has been accused of having turned the New Zealand business into a 'sunset industry' which will eventually die out.

In the financial year 2003 / 2004 coastal cargo in New Zealand totalled around 8.6 million tonnes, of which 85% was still carried by local, and 15% by overseas shipping.

In 2009, the National Party announced that funding for coastal shipping and supporting infrastructure, part of the "Sea Change" plan of the previous Labour government, would be cut to a substantial degree. The move was heavily criticised, amongst others, by the Green Party, and the Maritime Union of New Zealand.

Ferry services

Regular roll-on/roll-off ferry services have crossed Cook Strait, linking the North and South Islands between Wellington and Picton, since 1962. Services are provided five ferries operated by two companies: Interislander (a division of KiwiRail), and Bluebridge (Strait Shipping). One ferry used by the Interislander, is a rail ferry capable of transporting both road and rail on separate decks.

Depending on the vessel, usual transit time between the North and South Islands is 3 to 3.5 hours. Faster catamaran ferries were used by Tranz Rail and its competitors between 1994 and 2004. To reduce voyage times, Tranz Rail proposed to relocate the South Island terminal of its services to Clifford Bay in Marlborough, which would also avoid a steep section of railway. This proposal has been shelved since the takeover by Toll Holdings in 2003.

Smaller ferries operate in the Bay of Islands, the Hokianga Harbour, the Hauraki Gulf / Tīkapa Moana and Waitematā Harbour, Tauranga Harbour, Wellington, the Marlborough Sounds, Lyttelton, between Bluff and Halfmoon Bay on Stewart Island / Rakiura, and elsewhere.

A passenger ferry service also operated for many years between Wellington and Lyttelton (the port closest to Christchurch). This service was operated by the Union Steam Ship Company, and the passenger ferries typically operated an overnight service, although in later years the last of these vessels, the Rangatira, operated alternate nights in each direction plus a daylight sailing from Lyttelton to Wellington on Saturdays (so as to get a balance of four sailings in each direction, each week). One of these passenger ferries, the Wahine, was lost in a storm as it entered Wellington Harbour on 10 April 1968, with the loss of 51 passengers and crew. The final sailing of the Rangatira, which was custom built and entered service in 1972, was on 15 September 1976, after two money-losing years (subsidised by the government).

Ports and harbours
Container ports: Ports of Auckland (Auckland), Port of Tauranga (Tauranga), Napier, Wellington, Nelson, Lyttelton (Christchurch), Timaru, Port Chalmers (Dunedin), Bluff
Other ports: Whangārei, Devonport (Auckland), Gisborne, New Plymouth, Whanganui, Picton, Westport, Greymouth
Freshwater: Rotorua (Lake Rotorua), Taupō (Lake Taupō), Queenstown and Kingston (Lake Wakatipu), Te Anau and Manapouri (Lake Manapouri)

Merchant marine fleet
 Ships by type Bulk 3, cargo 3, chemical tanker 1, container 1, passenger/cargo 5, petroleum tanker 2 
total: 15

As of 2021 the current container ship is the 1700 teu Moana Chief, which is operated by Pacifica Shipping, a subsidiary of the China Navigation Company, and was introduced in 2019.

History 
Government subsidies were used to establish routes, or increase frequencies. For example, in 1902 up to £30,000 a year was being offered to provide ships linking to specified South African ports.
The merchant marine was affected by World War 2, but by 1950 the flagged fleet totalled 2,884.

Air transport

New Zealand's air travel sector is served by 15 airlines. The largest airline is Air New Zealand, a state-owned flag carrier.

Airports

There are 123 airports (including aerodromes) in New Zealand. Five provide international air services (as well as domestic services); Auckland and Christchurch (the largest airports in the North and South Islands, respectively) provide long-haul and short-haul international services; and Wellington, Dunedin and Queenstown provide short-haul international services to Australia and Fiji. About 30 other airports provide scheduled domestic air services. The busiest airport is Auckland, which handled 16,487,648 (9,005,612 international and 7,482,036 domestic) passengers in the year ended December 2015.

With paved runways
total: 39
over : 2
 to : 1
 to : 12
 to : 23
under : 1

With unpaved runways
total: 84
 to : 3
 to : 33
under : 48

Heliports
New Zealand has 55 functioning heliports (and helipads), including 36 hospital heliports.

Carbon emissions 
The government recognises that, to comply with its Zero Carbon 2050 legislation, transport emissions need to be reduced. 47% of the country’s total domestic CO2 emissions come from transport. Since 1990, road transport emissions have more than doubled, forming 91% of transport emissions in 2019. Domestic aviation adds 6%, coastal shipping 2% and rail 1%.

See also
Automotive industry in New Zealand
Bridges in New Zealand
Tunnels in New Zealand
Trolleybus systems in New Zealand
Trams in New Zealand
Plug-in electric vehicles in New Zealand

Notes

References

External links

Ministry of Transport
Cook Strait Rail Ferries from NZ History online

 
Infrastructure in New Zealand